Bobby Tarantino II is the sixth mixtape by American rapper Logic. It was released on March 9, 2018, through Def Jam Recordings and Visionary Music Group. The mixtape features guest appearances from Logic's alter-ego, Young Sinatra, alongside 2 Chainz, Big Sean and Wiz Khalifa, with the production handled by Illmind, Marshmello and 6ix, among others. Bobby Tarantino II serves as a sequel to Logic's mixtape, Bobby Tarantino (2016).

Bobby Tarantino II was supported by three singles: "44 More", "Overnight" and "Everyday" with Marshmello.

Promotion
The mixtape was announced on March 7, 2018 with a two-minute promotional video featuring the characters of the Adult Swim series Rick and Morty unveiling a March 9, 2018 release date. The mixtape cover was revealed the next day.

Singles
"44 More" was released as the lead single from the mixtape on February 23, 2018. The track was produced by 6ix along with Illmind. The song peaked at number 22 on the Billboard Hot 100 chart.

"Overnight" was released as the mixtape's second single on February 28, 2018. A music video was released a day prior before the official release. The song was produced by 6ix.

"Everyday" with record producer Marshmello was released as the mixtape's third single on March 2, 2018. The song was produced by Marshmello.

Commercial performance
Bobby Tarantino II debuted at number one on the US Billboard 200 with 119,000 album-equivalent units, of which 32,000 were pure album sales in its first week. It is Logic's second number-one album after Everybody (2017). In its second week, the album dropped to number four on the chart, earning 47,000 units. In its third week, the album dropped to number six on the chart, earning 33,000 units. In its fourth week, the album dropped to number ten on the chart, earning 27,000 units. On September 11, 2018, the mixtape was certified gold by the Recording Industry Association of America (RIAA) for combined sales and album-equivalent units of over 500,000 units in the United States.

Track listing
Credits adapted from Tidal and BMI.

Notes
  signifies a co-producer
  signifies an additional producer
  signifies an uncredited co-producer
 "Grandpa's Space Ship" features additional vocals from Justin Roiland, voicing both Rick and Morty
 "Yuck" features additional vocals from Paul Rothenberg and Elton John 
 "Warm It Up" credits Logic as featured artist "Young Sinatra"

Sample credits
 "Contra" contains a sample of "Buried Alive" written by Sir Robert Hall II and David Cunningham, and performed by Logic.
 "BoomTrap Protocol" contains a sample from "Space Traveller", written and performed by Katsutoshi Morizono; a sample from "Like Woah", written by Sir Robert Hall II, Arjun Ivatury, John Cameron, and performed by Logic; and a sample from "Ink Blot", written by Sir Robert Hall II, Arjun Ivatury, Dominik Patrzek, Shuntaro Tanikawa, Michi Tanaka, and Jordan Houston, and performed by Logic.
 "Indica Badu" contains a sample from "Didn't Cha Know?" written by Erica Wright, James Yancey, and Philip Clendeninn, and performed by Erykah Badu.
 "Midnight" contains a sample from "Who U Wit?", written by Jonathan Smith, Sammie Norris, and Wendell Neal, and performed by The East Side Boyz; a sample from "925", written by Sir Robert Hall II, Lawrence Parker, Curtis Mayfield, Kendrick Lamar, Chauncey Hollis, and performed by Logic; and a sample from "Knots 85", written and performed by Frank Dukes.
 "Warm It Up" contains a sample from "Live on the Air", written by Sir Robert Hall II, and performed by Logic; a sample from "Life's a Bitch", written by Nasir Jones, Anthony Cruz, Olu Dara, Ronnie Wilson, and Oliver Scott, and performed by Nas; and a sample from "Ain't No Sunshine", written by Willis Jackson and Bill Withers, and performed by Willis Jackson.
 "State of Emergency" contains a sample from "Never Enough", written by Sir Robert Hall II, Minta Notini, Lindsey Lohan, Rob Kinelski, Adam Gusterson, Robert Mellin, Guy Wood, George Clinton, William Collins, Lorenzo Patterson, Abrim Tilmon, Bernard Worrell, Eric Wright, Andre Young, Steve Wyreman, Claire Courchene, and Kevin Randolph, and performed by Logic.
 "Wassup" contains a sample from "Cuh Oonuh", written and performed by Reggie Stepper, and a sample from "Mercy", written by Kanye West, Stephan Taft, Sean Anderson, Terrence Thornton, Tauheed Epps, Michael Williams II, Ross Birchard, Michael Dean, James Thomas, Denzie Beagle, Winston Riley, and Reggie Williams, and performed by West, Big Sean, Pusha T, and 2 Chainz.
 "44 More" contains a sample from "Zoom", written by Nayvadius Wilburn, Joshua Luellen, Eduardo Earle Jr., and Ramon Ibanga Jr., and performed by Future, and a sample from "Waves", written by Kanye West, Christopher M. Brown, Scott Mescudi, Cydel Young, Tony Williams, Elon Rutberg, Ross Birchard, Derek Watkins, Michael Dean, Chancellor Bennett, Leland Wayne, Ernest Brown, Fred Brathwaithe, Robin Diggs, Kevin Ferguson, Theodore Livingston, Darryl Mason, and James Whipper, and performed by West.

Personnel
Credits adapted from Tidal.

 Performance
 Logic - main artist
 Wiz Khalifa - featured artist 
 2 Chainz - featured artist 
 Big Sean - featured artist 
 Marshmello - featured artist 
 Justin Roiland - vocals 
 Paul Rothenberg - vocals 
 Elton John - vocals 

 Production
 6ix - executive production, production 
 Logic - executive production, production 
 BLWYRMND - uncredited production 
 OZ - production 
 AG - production 
 Frank Dukes - production 
 Tariq Beats - production 
 Vontae Thomas - production 
 DJ Khalil - production , additional production 
 Marshmello - production 
 Kevin Randolph - additional production 
 Tee-Watt - additional production 

 Technical
 Justin Roiland - recording 
 Bobby Campbell - mixing , recording 
 Robert Campbell - mixing , recording 
 KY - mixing 
 Nolan Presley - recording

Charts

Weekly charts

Year-end charts

Certifications

References

2018 mixtape albums
Logic (rapper) albums
Def Jam Recordings albums
Albums produced by DJ Khalil
Albums produced by Illmind
Albums produced by Frank Dukes
Sequel albums
Trap music albums